Netrocoryne repanda, the bronze flat, eastern bronze flat, or eastern flat, is a butterfly found in Australia, belonging to the subfamily Pyrginae of the family Hesperiidae.

Gallery

References

Butterflies of Australia
Tagiadini
Butterflies described in 1867
Taxa named by Baron Cajetan von Felder
Taxa named by Rudolf Felder